Alvord is a city in Lyon County, Iowa, United States. The population was 206 at the 2020 census.

Geography
Alvord is located at  (43.342324, -96.303715).

Demographics

2010 census
As of the census of 2010, there were 196 people, 79 households, and 54 families living in the city. The racial makeup of the city was 89.8% White, 8.2% from other races, and 2.0% from two or more races. Hispanic or Latino of any race were 11.2% of the population.

There were 79 households, of which 32.9% had children under the age of 18 living with them, 60.8% were married couples living together, 3.8% had a female householder with no husband present, 3.8% had a male householder with no wife present, and 31.6% were non-families. 29.1% of all households were made up of individuals, and 15.2% had someone living alone who was 65 years of age or older. The average household size was 2.48 and the average family size was 3.04.

The median age in the city was 38.5 years. 27.6% of residents were under the age of 18; 7% were between the ages of 18 and 24; 24.5% were from 25 to 44; 28.1% were from 45 to 64; and 12.8% were 65 years of age or older. The gender makeup of the city was 50.5% male and 49.5% female.

2000 census
As of the census of 2000, there were 187 people, 75 households, and 54 families living in the city. The racial makeup of the city was 100.00% White.

There were 75 households, out of which 33.3% had children under the age of 18 living with them, 69.3% were married couples living together, 2.7% had a female householder with no husband present, and 26.7% were non-families. 25.3% of all households were made up of individuals, and 14.7% had someone living alone who was 65 years of age or older. The average household size was 2.49 and the average family size was 3.02.

In the city, the population was spread out, with 24.1% under the age of 18, 8.6% from 18 to 24, 27.8% from 25 to 44, 24.1% from 45 to 64, and 15.5% who were 65 years of age or older. The median age was 36 years. For every 100 females, there were 94.8 males. For every 100 females age 18 and over, there were 94.5 males.

The median income for a household in the city was $38,750, and the median income for a family was $41,786. Males had a median income of $31,250 versus $20,625 for females. The per capita income for the city was $17,300. None of the families and 2.0% of the population were living below the poverty line, including no under eighteens and 16.7% of those over 64.

Notable person 

Agnes Allen, pitcher and outfielder who played from 1950 to 1953 in the All-American Girls Professional Baseball League.

References

Cities in Iowa
Cities in Lyon County, Iowa